Beaver Brook is a stream that runs through Windham and Scotland, Windham County, Connecticut. It is currently five miles long. It begins at Beaver Brook State Park in Windham, Connecticut, and flows down to Merrick Brook in Scotland, Connecticut. A saw shop named after it is located near the border between the two towns.

Crossings

References 

Rivers of Connecticut
Rivers of Windham County, Connecticut
Windham, Connecticut
Scotland, Connecticut
Tributaries of the Thames River (Connecticut)